The African Convention on the Conservation of Nature and Natural Resources (known also as Algiers Convention) is a continent-wide agreement signed in 1968 in Algiers. It supersedes the Convention Relative to the Preservation of Fauna and Flora in their Natural State of 1933 and has been superseded by the African Convention on Conservation of Nature and Natural Resources (revised) signed in Maputo in 2003.

Notes

References

1968 in the environment
Nature conservation in South Africa
Nature conservation in Tanzania
Nature conservation in Uganda
Environment of Africa
Environmental treaties
Treaties concluded in 1968
Treaties entered into force in 1969
Treaties of Algeria
Treaties of Burkina Faso
Treaties of Cameroon
Treaties of the Central African Republic
Treaties of the Comoros
Treaties of the Republic of the Congo
Treaties of Ivory Coast
Treaties of Zaire
Treaties of Djibouti
Treaties of Egypt
Treaties of Gabon
Treaties of Ghana
Treaties of Kenya
Treaties of Liberia
Treaties of Madagascar
Treaties of Malawi
Treaties of Mali
Treaties of the People's Republic of Mozambique
Treaties of Niger
Treaties of Nigeria
Treaties of Rwanda
Treaties of Senegal
Treaties of Seychelles
Treaties of the Democratic Republic of the Sudan
Treaties of Eswatini
Treaties of Tanzania
Treaties of Togo
Treaties of Tunisia
Treaties of Uganda
Treaties of Zambia
1968 in Algeria
Nature conservation in Africa
Animal treaties